Petr Křivánek (born 18 March 1970) is a Czech former football player. He played club football for fourteen years at Brno, where he was captain. He also played international football for the Czech Republic. He made his single appearance for the national team against Iceland on 4 September 1996. He played his 300th top-flight match in April 2004, all for Brno. He left Brno in 2005 after 14 seasons at the club.

References

External links
 
 
 

1970 births
Living people
Czechoslovak footballers
Czech footballers
Czech Republic international footballers
Czech First League players
FC Zbrojovka Brno players
Footballers from Brno
Association football defenders